Gregory Lee Riddoch (born July 17, 1945 in Greeley, Colorado) is a retired American professional baseball player, manager and coach who served as manager of the San Diego Padres of Major League Baseball from July 12, 1990 through September 22, 1992, compiling a career win–loss record of 200–194 (.508).  

He attended Colorado State University and the University of Northern Colorado, and was an infielder for five seasons (1967–71) in the Cincinnati Reds' organization. He spent 13 seasons as a minor league manager in the short-season Northwest League and the Rookie-level Pioneer League, and was a coach for the Padres from  until the 1990 All-Star break when he succeeded Jack McKeon as the San Diego manager.

During his baseball career, he also served as third base coach for the Tampa Bay Devil Rays (1998–99), director of minor league clubs for the Reds (1985–86) and director of player development of the Milwaukee Brewers (2000–02).  He retired in 2010 following a four-year stint as manager for the Eugene Emeralds of Northwest League, then affiliated with the Padres.  Earlier in his career, when the Emeralds were a Reds' farm team, Riddoch had managed them for six seasons (1975–76; 1978–81), for a total of ten years as manager in Eugene.

References

External links

Baseball-Reference.com - career managing record
Article on career

1945 births
Living people
Asheville Tourists players
Billings Mustangs managers
Colorado State Rams baseball players
Eugene Emeralds managers
Major League Baseball bench coaches
Major League Baseball farm directors
Major League Baseball third base coaches
San Diego Padres coaches
San Diego Padres managers
Sioux Falls Packers players
Spokane Indians managers
Sportspeople from Eugene, Oregon
Tampa Bay Devil Rays coaches
Tampa Tarpons (1957–1987) players
Trois-Rivières Aigles players